Alipurduars Assembly constituency is an assembly constituency in Alipurduar district in the Indian state of West Bengal.

Overview
As per orders of the Delimitation Commission, No. 12  Alipurduars Assembly constituency covers Alipurduar municipality, Alipurduar Railway Junction, Banchukamari, Chakowakheti, Mathura, Parorpar, Patlakhawa, Shalkumar I, Shalkumar II, Tapsikhata, Vivekananda II, Vivekananda I gram panchayats of Alipurduar I community development block, and Chaporerpar I, Chaporerpar II, and Tatpara II  gram panchayats of Alipurduar II community development block.

Alipurduars Assembly constituency is part of No. 2  Alipurduars (Lok Sabha constituency) (ST).

Members of Legislative Assembly

Election results

1951–1972
Narayan Bhattacharya of Congress won in 1972 and 1971. Nani Bhattacharya of RSP won in 1969 and 1967. Pijush Kanti Mukherjee of Congress won in 1962 and 1957. In independent India's first election in 1951, it was a joint seat. Pijush Kanti Mukherjee and Dhirandra Brahma Mandal, both of Congress, won.

1977-2006
Contests in most years were multi cornered but only winners and runners are being mentioned. In the 2006, 2001, 1996 and 1991 state assembly elections, Nirmal Das of RSP defeated Sourav Chakraborty of Congress, Prasanta Narayan Majumdar of Trinamool Congress, Manindralal Rakshit of Congress and Biswa Ranjan Sarkar of Congress respectively. Nani Bhattacharya of RSP defeated Debabrata Chatterjee of Congress in 1987, Pallab Ghosh of Congress in 1982 and Narayan Bhattachary of Congress in 1977.

2011

In the 2011 West Bengal Legislative Assembly election, Debaprasad Roy of Congress defeated his nearest rival Kshiti Goswami of RSP.

2016

In the 2016 West Bengal Legislative Assembly election, Sourav Chakraborty of TMC defeated his nearest rival Biswaranjan Sarkar of Congress.

2021

In the 2021 West Bengal Legislative Assembly election, Suman Kanjilal of BJP defeated his nearest rival Sourav Chakraborty of TMC.

References

Assembly constituencies of West Bengal
Politics of Alipurduar district
Alipurduar district